Erythrinus kessleri is a species of trahira (family Erythrinidae). It is a tropical, freshwater fish which is known from coastal rivers in Bahia, Brazil; the type locality is the Itapicuru River. It was described by Franz Steindachner in 1877. Males can reach a maximum standard length of 19 centimetres.

Although the patronym was not identified, it was probably in honor of German-Russian zoologist Karl Fedorovich Kessler (1815-1881).

References

External links
 Erythrinus kessleri at www.fishwise.co.za
 Erythrinus kessleri at ITIS

Erythrinidae
Fish described in 1877